Rodziński (feminine: Rodzińska) is a surname of Polish origin. Notable people with this surname include:

 Artur Rodziński (1892-1958), Polish conductor
 Witold Rodziński (1918-1997), Polish historian, sinologist and diplomat

See also
 
 

Polish-language surnames